Unser Mund sei voll Lachens (May our mouth be full of laughter), 110, is a church cantata by Johann Sebastian Bach. He composed the Christmas cantata in Leipzig for Christmas Day and first performed it on 25 December 1725.

Bach composed the cantata in his third year as Thomaskantor in Leipzig. He used a text by Georg Christian Lehms, which was published already in 1711. The text has no recitatives alternating with arias, but instead three biblical quotations, opening with verses from Psalm 126, then a verse from the Book of Jeremiah about God's greatness, and finally the angels' song from the Nativity according to the Gospel of Luke. The closing chorale is taken from Caspar Füger's "Wir Christenleut".

Bach scored the work festively for four vocal soloists, a four-part choir and a Baroque instrumental ensemble of trumpets and timpani, transverse flutes, different kinds of oboe, strings and basso continuo including bassoon. He derived the first chorus, in the style of a French overture, from the overture to his fourth Orchestral Suite, embedding vocal parts in its fast middle section. The song of the angels is based on the Christmas interpolation Virga Jesse Floruit of his Magnificat in E-flat major, BWV 243a. He chose obbligato instruments to differentiate the character of the three arias: two flutes with the tenor expressing the "lowly birth", oboe d'amore with the alto, representing God's love, and trumpet, oboes and strings with the bass for his call to sing songs of joy together. Bach led the Thomanerchor in the first performances on Christmas Day, one in the Nikolaikirche and one in the Thomaskirche.

History and words 
Bach composed the cantata in his third year as Thomaskantor in Leipzig for Christmas Day, the first day of a Christmas celebration which lasted for three days. The prescribed readings for the feast day were from the Epistle of Titus, "God's mercy appeared" or from Isaiah, "Unto us a child is born", and from the Gospel of Luke, the Nativity, Annunciation to the shepherds and the angels' song.

In 1723, his first year in Leipzig, Bach had composed no new cantata for Christmas Day, but revived Christen, ätzet diesen Tag, BWV 63, on a text of free poetry without any biblical or chorale content. That year, he composed new works for the second and third feast day. In 1724, his second year, he composed three chorale cantatas for the three feast days, beginning with Gelobet seist du, Jesu Christ, BWV 91. In his third year, Bach used a cantata text by Georg Christian Lehms, which was published already in 1711 in Darmstadt in the collection Gottgefälliges Kirchen-Opffer. The librettist began with a quotation of two verses from Psalm 126 which deals with the hope for delivery of Jerusalem, "When the Lord turned again the captivity of Zion, we were like them that dream.", and the joyful reaction. The poet included for a recitative a verse from the Book of Jeremiah, praising God's greatness, and he quoted from the Christmas story in the Gospel of Luke the singing of the angels. In this early text, three biblical quotations alternate with arias. The closing chorale is the fifth stanza of Caspar Füger's hymn "Wir Christenleut".

Bach led the Thomanerchor in the first performance in the morning of Christmas Day in the Nikolaikirche, repeated in the afternoon in the Thomaskirche. He led at least one more performance between 1728 and 1731.

Some Bach scholars believed that the cantata was written in 1734 for the end of the War of the Polish Succession, but the discovery of the printed text showed that it was not related. The cantata was not published until 1876 when it appeared in the Bach Gesellschaft Ausgabe, the first complete edition of the composer's works.

Structure and scoring 
Bach structured the cantata in seven movements. An opening chorus and a closing chorale frame a sequence of arias, a recitative and a duet. Bach scored the work for four vocal soloists (soprano (S), alto (A), tenor (T), bass (B)), a four-part choir and a Baroque instrumental ensemble of three trumpets and timpani (Ti), two transverse flutes (Ft), three oboes (Ob) (also oboe d'amore and oboe da caccia), two violins (Vl), viola (Va), and basso continuo including bassoon. The heading of the original parts reads: "J.J. Feria 1 Nativitatis Xsti. Concerto. a 3 Trombe, Tamburi. 3 Hautb. / Baßon. 2 Violini e Viola, 4 Voci è Continuo.", which means "Jesus help. First feast day of the birth of Christ. Concerto for 3 trumpets, timpani, 3 oboes, bassoon, 2 violins and viola, 4 voices and continuo". The duration is given as 27 minutes.

In the following table of the movements, the scoring follows the Neue Bach-Ausgabe. The keys and time signatures are taken from the book on all cantatas by the Bach scholar Alfred Dürr, using the symbols for common time (4/4) and alla breve (2/2). The continuo, playing throughout, is not shown.

Music 
In 1725, Bach typically composed alternating recitatives and arias in his cantatas, both on contemporary poetry. The text for this work is in an older style, with biblical texts interspersed with arias. Bach followed it, using different musical forms for the biblical quotations. The opening chorus on psalm verses is an adaptation of his overture to his fourth Orchestral Suite in D major, BWV 1069. The duet "Ehre sei Gott in der Höhe" is based on the Christmas interpolation Virga Jesse floruit from Bach's Magnificat in E-flat major, BWV 243a, of 1723, performed for his first Christmas in Leipzig.

1 

The opening chorus is "" (May our mouth be full of laughter). It calls for all instruments to perform. The text "concludes with acknowledgement that the Lord has achieved great things for his people". Bach based the music on the overture to his fourth Orchestral Suite in D major, adding festive trumpets and timpani as well as flutes to the original music and embedding the voices. He followed the format of the French overture by instrumental slow sections framing the fast choral section. The French overture, normally played upon the arrival of the king to a performance, seemed suitable to greet the King of Heaven. The laughter mentioned in the text is "often made quite graphically audible", as the Bach Scholar Alfred Dürr words it. When Bach performed the work again later, he marked some vocal sections as "ripieno", achieving even more variety in the "concerto". John Eliot Gardiner, who conducted the Bach Cantata Pilgrimage, interprets it as Bach's vote against a strict one voice per part concept. He chose this cantata in one of three Christmas concerts to conclude the endeavour of a full year, and notes the first movement's "marvellous rendition of laughter-in-music" and "innate elegance and lightness of touch".

2 
A tenor aria, "" (You thoughts and musings), is accompanied by two transverse flutes. Dürr interprets the choice of the flutes as a symbol for the "lowly birth".

3 
A bass recitative, "" (There is no one like You, Lord), is accompanied by the strings, which accompany the expressive line of the bass voice by "upward-pointing gestures".

4 
The alto aria, "" (Ah, Lord, what is a human being), is accompanied by a solo oboe d'amore that "expresses wonder about the nature of man" and God's interest in him. The aria, as the first one, is not a da capo aria, but in two parts. The idea of man in a sinful condition which is presented first, is changed to redemption. The Bach scholar Klaus Hofmann relates the choice of the oboe d'amore to the answer to the singer's question "Why do you do all this for man?": "Aus Liebe" (through love).

5 
The duet "" (Glory to God in the highest), combines two high voices over a simple continuo accompaniment, singing of God's glory in the highest and peace on Earth. The music is based on the Virga Jesse floruit from the Magnificat, changing the vocal lines to the different text but retaining the "essentially lyrical character". Gardiner notes that "goodwill towards men" is expressed in pastoral style, with the voices in parallels of tenths.

6 
The bass aria "" (Awaken, veins and limbs), is a final call to wake up and join the praise of the angels. Trumpet and oboe add to energetic music. The oboes double the strings or rest, for more dynamic effect. Virtuoso passages in the trumpets are reminiscent of the first movement. The first triad call of the trumpet is of martial character, and imitated by the voice. When the text refers to the strings, the winds have a rest.

7 
The closing chorale, "" (Alleluia! Praise be to God), is a four-part setting of the tune by an anonymous composer. Bach set the same tune again to close Part III of his Christmas Oratorio with another stanza from the hymn, "Seid froh, dieweil" (Be glad, therefore).

Recordings 
The listing is taken from the selection on the Bach Cantatas Website. Instrumental groups playing period instruments in historically informed performances are highlighted green under the header .

References

Sources 
 
 Unser Mund sei voll Lachens BWV 110; BC A 10 / Sacred cantata (1st Christmas Day) Bach Digital
 BWV 110 Unser Mund sei voll Lachens English translation, University of Vermont
 Recordings of BWV 110 at Classical Music Online
 Luke Dahn: BWV 110.7 bach-chorales.com

External links 
 Unser Mund sei voll Lachens, BWV 110: performance by the Netherlands Bach Society (video and background information)

Church cantatas by Johann Sebastian Bach
Psalm-related compositions by Johann Sebastian Bach
1725 compositions
Christmas cantatas